John Gosselyn may refer to:

John Gosselyn (MP for Weymouth) (fl. 1384–1386)
John Gosselyn (MP for Lewes) (fl. 1417–1429)

See also
Jon Gosselin, American TV presenter